Khorramabad is the capital of Lorestan Province, Iran.

Khorramabad and other transliterations (Khurramobod, Horramobod,  Xurremabad, etc.) may also refer to:

Places

Alborz Province
Khorramabad, Alborz, a village in Nazarabad County
Khorramabad, Karaj, a village in Karaj County

Ardabil Province
Khorramabad, Ardabil, a village in Meshgin Shahr County

East Azerbaijan Province
Khorramabad, East Azerbaijan, a village in Ahar County

Fars Province
Khorramabad, Jahrom, a village in Jahrom County
Khorramabad, Kharameh, a village in Kharameh County

Gilan Province
Khorramabad, Gilan, a village in Shaft County

Golestan Province
Khorramabad, Golestan, a village in Kordkuy County

Hamadan Province
Khorramabad, Hamadan, a village in Malayer County, Hamadan Province, Iran

Isfahan Province
Khorramabad, Ardestan, a village in Ardestan County
Khorramabad, Jolgeh, a village in Isfahan County
Khorramabad, Mobarakeh, a village in Mobarakeh County

Kerman Province
Khorramabad, Arzuiyeh, a village in Arzuiyeh County
Khorramabad, Rafsanjan, a village in Rafsanjan County

Kermanshah Province
Khorramabad-e Olya, Kermanshah, a village in Ravansar County
Khorramabad-e Sofla, Kermanshah, a village in Ravansar County

Kurdistan Province
Khorramabad, Kurdistan, a village in Bijar County

Lorestan Province
Khorramabad County, an administrative subdivision of Lorestan Province, Iran
Khorramabad Airport

Markazi Province
Khorramabad, Arak, a village in Arak County
Khorramabad, Saveh, a village in Saveh County
Khorramabad, Nowbaran, a village in Saveh County
Khorramabad-e Laqu, a village in Zarandieh County

Mazandaran Province
Khorramabad, Mazandaran, a city in Mazandaran Province, Iran
Khorramabad, Nur, a village in Nur County
Khorramabad, Sari, a village in Sari County
Khorramabad, Dodangeh, a village in Sari County
Khorramabad District, an administrative subdivision of Mazandaran Province, Iran

North Khorasan Province
Khorramabad, North Khorasan, a village in North Khorasan Province, Iran

Qazvin Province
Khorramabad, Takestan, a village in Takestan County, Qazvin Province, Iran
Khorramabad Rural District, an administrative subdivision of Qazvin Province, Iran

Qom Province
Khorramabad, Qom, a village in Qom Province, Iran

Razavi Khorasan Province
Khorramabad, Bardaskan, a village in Bardaskan County
Khorramabad, Chenaran, a village in Chenaran County
Khorramabad, Jowayin, a village in Jowayin County
Khorramabad, Mashhad, a village in Mashhad County
Khorramabad, Binalud, a village in Nishapur County
Khorramabad, Fazl, a village in Nishapur County
Khorramabad, Torbat-e Jam, a village in Torbat-e Jam County
Khorramabad-e Olya, Razavi Khorasan, a village in Torbat-e Jam County
Khorramabad-e Sofla, Razavi Khorasan, a village in Torbat-e Jam County

Semnan Province

South Khorasan Province
Khorramabad, Boshruyeh, a village in Boshruyeh County
Khorramabad, Qaen, a village in Qaen County

West Azerbaijan Province
Khorramabad, Urmia, a village in Urmia County
Khorramabad, Anzal, a village in Urmia County

Yazd Province
Khorramabad, Yazd, a village in Abarkuh County

Zanjan Province
Khorramabad Kahriz, a village in Tarom County

Other
Khorramabadi dialect
Xurramobod, a village in Uzbekistan
Khurramobod, Tajikistan, a village in Sughd Region, Tajikistan
, a 2000 novel by Andrei Volos